Vatiga illudens, the cassava lace bug, is a species of lace bug in the family Tingidae. It is found in the Caribbean and South America.

References

Further reading

 
 
 

Tingidae
Articles created by Qbugbot
Insects described in 1922